Alma was an electoral district of the Legislative Assembly in the Australian state of New South Wales from 1894 to 1904, named after Alma, a locality in southern Broken Hill, now known as South Broken Hill.

Members for Alma
Thomas entered federal politics by the winning the seat of Barrier at the first Commonwealth election. William Williams succeeded Thomas after narrowing defeating Jabez Wright in the 1901 election.

See also

References

Alma
1894 establishments in Australia
1904 disestablishments in Australia
Alma
Alma